The 123d Fighter Squadron is a unit of the Oregon Air National Guard 142d Fighter Wing located at Portland Air National Guard Base, Oregon.  The 123d is equipped with the McDonnell Douglas F-15C Eagle.

The squadron is a descendant organization of the 123d Observation Squadron formed on 30 July 1940.  It was activated on 18 April 1941.  The squadron is one of the 29 original National Guard Observation Squadrons of the United States Army National Guard formed before World War II.

History

Oregon National Guard
Allocated to the Oregon National Guard in 1940, activated on 18 April 1941 at Portland Municipal Airport.  The newly formed unit began operations with two officers, 108 enlisted men and two aircraft, a North American BC-1A (like the AT-6) and a Douglas O-46A. The squadron flew observation missions primarily along the Pacific Coast and occasionally made mail flights.

World War II
Ordered to active service in September 1941 as part of the pre-World War II buildup of the United States Army Air Corps and assigned to the 70th Observation Group of Fourth Air Force.  After the Japanese attack on Pearl Harbor, flew antisubmarine patrols along the Pacific Coast from airfields in Oregon and Washington, later becoming part of the air defense forces of Southern California.   This included one of the first missions flown from a U.S. base on 7 December 1941.  Flew antisubmarine patrols until mid-1943 when the mission was turned over to the United States Navy.

Reassigned to Third Air Force, sent first to Texas then to Oklahoma being trained for combat reconnaissance and aerial photography to support Army ground forces.   Was deployed to Fourteenth Air Force in China as part of the China Burma India Theater, engaged in unarmed observation flights over Japanese-held territory supporting Chinese Nationalist forces.  Flew North American B-25 Mitchells, Douglas A-20 Havocs and DB-7 Bostons originally built for the RAF.  Flew from rough and remote airfields in China throughout the rest of the War, later flying unarmed high-speed long-range Lockheed P-38 Lightnings and F-5 reconnaissance Lightnings. The squadron received credit for participation in seven campaigns in World War II. Not all 123d personnel served with the 35th PRS, as some were diverted to other units as early as 1942 and served elsewhere in the Pacific and in Europe.

As part of the large drawdown of forces after the war, the 35th PRS inactivated on 7 November 1945, at Camp Kilmer, New Jersey.

Oregon Air National Guard
The wartime squadron, designated the 35th Photographic Reconnaissance Squadron redesignated as the 123d Fighter Squadron, Single Engine and was allotted to the Oregon Air National Guard, on 24 May 1946. It was organized at Portland Municipal Airport, Oregon, and was extended federal recognition on 26 June 1946 by the National Guard Bureau. 

The 123d FS was assigned to the 142d Fighter Group at Portland Municipal Airport.  Thus the 142d FG began fighter operations for the first time in the North American North American F-51D Mustang with 75 officers and 800 enlisted men. The unit had a mission of the air defense of the State of Oregon.

Korean War activation
The squadron was called to active duty on 10 February 1951 as a result of the Korean War.  It was redesignated the 123d Fighter-Interceptor Squadron and assigned to the 325th Fighter-Interceptor Wing, which was stationed at McChord Air Force Base, Washington, although the squadron remained at Portland Municipal Airport.   However, Air Defense Command was experiencing difficulty under the existing wing base organizational structure in deploying its fighter squadrons to best advantage. As a result, in February 1952 the 123d was assigned to the 4704th Defense Wing, which was organized on a regional basis.

The squadron conducted air interception training missions with its F-51s until June 1952 when it was re-equipped with the North American F-86F Sabre daylight interceptor. On 1 November 1952, the 123rd was released back to the Oregon ANG and its personnel, mission and equipment were absorbed by the newly activated 357th Fighter-Interceptor Squadron.

Cold War

Reformed as part of the 142d Fighter-Interceptor Group, retaining F-86F Sabres.  It resumed its peacetime mission of the air defense of Oregon. Was upgraded by ADC in 1955 to the dedicated Lockheed F-94A Starfire all-weather interceptor.  With this new aircraft, the mission of the 123d Fighter-Interceptor Squadron changed from day interceptor to day and night all-weather interceptor. In 1957 the 123d again upgraded to the improved Northrop F-89J Scorpion then in 1966 to the supersonic Convair F-102A Delta Dagger.  In the summer of 1958, the 142d implemented the ADC Runway Alert Program, in which interceptors of the 123d Fighter-Interceptor Squadron were committed to a five-minute runway alert 24/7/365.  The runway alert continues to this day.

In 1972 it received the Mach 2 McDonnell  F-101B Voodoo. As an example of the unit's readiness and capability, in 1976, the unit won top honors at a pair of Aerospace Defense Command competitions, the Weapons Loading Competition and the William Tell Air Defense Competition.  In William Tell 1976, the 142nd garnered first place in the F-101 category and Lt. Col. Don Tonole and Maj. Brad Newell captured the overall "Top Gun" title flying the McDonnell F-101B Voodoo.

After the inactivation of Aerospace Defense Command in 1979 and the reassignment to Tactical Air Command (ADTAC), the 123d began receiving McDonnell F-4C Phantom II aircraft used in the interceptor mission beginning in 1981.  Success came again at William Tell 1984 when the unit placed first in the F-4 category flying the McDonnell-Douglas F-4C Phantom II and beat many of its McDonnell F-15 Eagle and Convair F-106 Delta Dart rivals in the overall competition. Majors Ron Moore and Bill Dejager were the overall F-4 "Top Guns" of the competition.

In 1985, as part of the retirement of the F-4C from the inventory, the Oregon Air National Guard began to receive F-15A Eagles from active-duty units receiving the upgraded F-15C.  Since the end of the Cold War, the 142d has served as the principal air defense unit of the Pacific Northwest. In 1992, as part of a large USAF reorganization, both the group and squadron were re-designated yet again as the 142d Fighter Group and the 123d Fighter Squadron, respectively. In 1995 the group was elevated to wing status, beginning its current designation as the 142d Fighter Wing.

The wing participated in a wide variety of expeditionary and humanitarian assistance missions in the turbulent post-Cold War environment while providing air defense of the Pacific Northwest. These included major deployments to Turkey in 1998 for Operation Northern Watch and to Saudi Arabia in 2000 for Operation Southern Watch, patrolling the no-fly zones then in place over Iraq. The wing deployed aircraft to Panama in 1998 in support of counter=drug missions, helping stem the flow of the drug trade by air. Wing personnel deployed on various other missions, sending medical troops to Belize, civil engineers to Macedonia, and to such places around the globe as Curaçao, Denmark, Germany, Guam, Kuwait, Spain and the United Kingdom.

Global War on Terrorism
On 11 September 2001, the wing was one of the first units to respond to terrorist attacks on the east coast with increased air defense to enhance security on the west coast, and subsequently participated in Operation Noble Eagle, the national military response to homeland defense.

In the 50th Year of William Tell Anniversary Competition held in 2004, the 142d Fighter Wing was rated first in maintenance, element attack and gun categories. These William Tell successes demonstrate Oregon's long history of excellent performance and readiness to accomplish the real world mission.

In 2004, unit personnel provided humanitarian aid in the wake of Hurricanes Katrina and Rita and the 2007 floods in Vernonia, Oregon. The wing also supported ongoing contingency operations in Southwest Asia, including Operation Iraqi Freedom and Operation Enduring Freedom, such as in the 2004 deployment of medical personnel to Qatar and the 2009 deployment of Security Forces Squadron personnel to Iraq.

In 2005, the early 1970s F-15A model were retired and the squadron received its current aircraft, the F-15C Eagle. With more than 1,000 officers and airmen, the 142d Fighter Wing guards the Pacific Northwest skies from northern California to the Canada–US border, on 24-hour Air Sovereignty Alert as part of Air Combat Command and the North American Aerospace Defense Command (NORAD). The wing also stands ready to participate in state and federal contingency missions as required.

In August 2010, two F-15 Eagles from this wing were dispatched in response to an airspace violation while the President visited Seattle, Washington. The jets produced two sonic booms over the Seattle skyline, the civilian Cessna 182 left restricted airspace before the jets arrived.

In August 2018, a Horizon Airlines Bombardier Dash 8 Q400 was stolen from Sea-Tac Int'l Airport by a mechanic. The plane was airborne for about an hour, and during that time performed several stunt maneuvers including a barrel roll. Two F-15C Eagles scrambled to intercept this aircraft to ensure it did not fly over any populated areas. They maintained communication with the pilot during his time in the air, but within minutes of their intercept, the plane nosedived and crashed into nearby Ketron Island, a sparsely populated island in the Puget Sound. There were no passengers or crew on board the plane, and the pilot was killed in the crash.

Lineage
 Designated as the 123d Observation Squadron, and allotted to the National Guard on 30 July 1940
 Activated on 18 April 1941
 Ordered to active service on 15 September 1941
 Redesignated 123d Observation Squadron (Light) on 13 January 1942
 Redesignated 123d Observation Squadron on 4 July 1942
 Redesignated 123d Reconnaissance Squadron (Bombardment) on 2 April 1943
 Redesignated 35th Photographic Reconnaissance Squadron on 11 August 1943
 Inactivated on 7 November 1945
 Redesignated 123d Fighter Squadron, Single Engine and allotted to the National Guard 24 May 1946
 Extended federal recognition on 26 June 1946
 Federalized and placed on active duty, 10 February 1951
 Redesignated 123d Fighter-Interceptor Squadron on 1 March 1952
 Inactivated and returned to Oregon state control on 1 November 1952
 Activated c. 1 December 1952
 Redesignated 123d Fighter Squadron 31 March 1992

Assignments
 Oregon National Guard, 18 April 1941
 70th Observation Group (later 70th Reconnaissance Group), 15 September 1941
 77th Tactical Reconnaissance Group, 11 August 1943 (attached to 70th Tactical Reconnaissance Group until 31 October 1943)
 III Reconnaissance Command (later III Tactical Air Command), 30 November 1943
 Army Air Forces, India-Burma Sector, 5 May 1944
 Fourteenth Air Force, c. September 1944
 Tenth Air Force, 1 August 1945
 Fourteenth Air Force, 25 August – 7 November 1945
 Oregon National Guard, 26 June 1946
 142d Fighter Group, 30 August 1946
 Fourth Air Force, 10 February 1951 (attached to 325th Fighter-Interceptor Wing)
 4704th Air Defense Wing, 6 February 1952 – 1 November 1952
 142d Fighter-Interceptor Group (later 142d Fighter Group, 142d Fighter-Interceptor Group, 142d Fighter Wing), 1 December 1952
 142d Operations Group, 1 March 1994

Stations

 Portland Airport, Oregon, 18 April 1941
 Gray Field, Washington, 25 September 1941 (detachment operated from Bowerman Field, Washington, 15 March – c. August 1942
 Ontario Army Air Field, California, 16 March 1943
 Roberts Field, California, 20 August 1943
 Gainesville Army Air Field, Texas, 10 November 1943
 Will Rogers Field, Oklahoma, 5 February – 10 April 1944
 Guskhara Airfield, India, 13 June 1944
 Kunming Airport, China, 1 September 1944
 Flight at Nanning Airfield, China, 16 September – 6 October 1944
 Flight at Yunnani Airfield, China, 16 September 1944 – 10 February 1945

 Chanyi Airfield, China, 17 September 1944
 Flight at Chihkiang Airfield, China, 19 October 1944 – c. 1 September 1945
 Flight at Suichwan Airfield, China, 19 November 1944 – 22 January 1945
 Flight at Chengkung Airfield, China, 10 February – 13 May 1945
 Flight at Laohwangping Airfield, China, 27 February-c. 1 September 1945
 Flight at Kunming Airport, China, 14 May – 31 July 1945
 Flight at Nanning Airfield, China, 31 July – c. 1 September 1945
 Luliang Airfield, China, 18–24 September 1945
 Camp Kilmer, New Jersey, 5–7 November 1945
 Portland International Airport, Oregon, 26 June 1946 – 1 November 1952
 Portland International Airport, Oregon, 1 December 1952 – present
 Designated Portland Air National Guard Base, Oregon, 1991–present

Aircraft

 North American O-47, 1941–1943
 Stinson O-49 Vigilant, 1941–1943
 Douglas O-46, 1941–1942
 North American B-25 Mitchell, 1943–1944, 1945
 Douglas A-20 Havoc, 1943
 Douglas DB-7 Boston, 1943
 Bell P-39 Airacobra, 1943–1944
 Lockheed P-38 Lightning, 1944
 Lockheed F-5 Lightning, 1944–1945
 North American F-51D Mustang, 1946–1952
 North American F-86F Sabre, 1952–1955
 Lockheed F-94A Starfire, 1955–1957
 Northrop F-89J Scorpion, 1957–1966
 Convair F-102A Delta Dagger, 1966–1971
 McDonnell F-101B Voodoo, 1972–1981
 McDonnell F-4C Phantom II, 1981–1989
 McDonnell F-15A Eagle, 1989–2009
 McDonnell F-15B Eagle, 1989–2009
 McDonnell F-15C Eagle, 2007 – present
 McDonnell F-15D Eagle, 2007 – present

See also

 List of observation squadrons of the United States Army National Guard

References

Notes
 Explanatory notes 

 Citations

Bibliography

 
 
 
 
 

 Further reading
 World Airpower Journal (1992) US Air Force Air Power Directory, Aerospace Publishing, London, UK.

External links

Squadrons of the United States Air National Guard
Fighter squadrons of the United States Air Force
Military units and formations in Oregon
1940 establishments in Oregon
Portland International Airport
Military units and formations established in 1940